The 1999 Gedling Borough Council election took place on 6 May 1999 to elect members of Gedling Borough Council in Nottinghamshire, England. The whole council was up for election and the Conservative party gained overall control of the council from the Labour party.

Background
At the last election in 1995 Labour took control of the council with 29 seats, compared to 20 for the Conservatives, 7 Liberal Democrats and 1 independent. Gedling was reported as being a swing council in 1999, with the Conservatives requiring 9 gains on a swing of 4.5% to win control.

Election result
Overall turnout in the election was 35.0%, down from 44.7% in 1995.

References

1999 English local elections
1999
1990s in Nottinghamshire